Charles Kemeys Kemeys Tynte or Charles Kemeys Kemeys-Tynte (29 May 1778 – 22 November 1860) was an English Whig politician who sat in the House of Commons from 1820 to 1837.

Life
Tynte was the son of Colonel John Johnson, who assumed the surname of Kemeys Tynte or Kemeys-Tynte, and his wife Jane Hassell, who was the niece of Sir Charles Tynte, 5th Baronet. He was educated at Eton College and St John's College, Cambridge. He lived at Halsewell House, Somerset and Kevanmably Glamorganshire and was a colonel of the West Somerset Cavalry.

In 1820, Tynte was elected Member of Parliament for Bridgwater. He held the seat until 1837.

Tynte Street, North Adelaide was named after this man on 23 May 1837.

Tynte died at the age of 82.

Family
Tynte married Anne Leyson, daughter of Rev. Thomas Leyson of Bassaleg. Their son Charles John Kemeys-Tynte was MP for Somerset West  and later for Bridgewater.

References

External links
 

1778 births
1860 deaths
People educated at Eton College
Alumni of St John's College, Cambridge
UK MPs 1832–1835
UK MPs 1820–1826
UK MPs 1826–1830
UK MPs 1830–1831
UK MPs 1831–1832
UK MPs 1835–1837
Whig (British political party) MPs for English constituencies